Cops and Robbers is a 1951 Italian cult comedy film directed by Steno and Mario Monicelli. It stars the famous comedian Totò, and the cinematographer was the future film director Mario Bava. It was produced by Dino De Laurentiis and Carlo Ponti.

Its style is close to Italian neorealism. Released in Italian cinemas in November 1951 and shown in competition at the Cannes Film Festival in 1952, earned the award for Piero Tellini the script and Totò the Nastro d'Argento. It had trouble with the censor because it portrayed clumsy police and smart thieves, but it was a great success. The film was a huge success and an unexpected liking by critics. Cops and robbers represented a real turning point in the career of Totò, so that for the first time his film was exclusively positive reviews, and its interpretation is considered one of the best of his career.

In 2008 the film was selected to enter the list of the 100 Italian films to be saved.

It was shown as part of a retrospective on Italian comedy at the 67th Venice International Film Festival.

Plot
The film is set in Rome during the Marshall Plan.
Ferdinando Esposito (Totò) is a small villain who tries to support his family with his tricks. With his accomplice Amilcare (Aldo Giuffrè) pretends to have found an ancient coin in the Roman Forum and an American tourist cheats: Mr. Locuzzo that, unfortunately for him, is the chairman of a committee of the American charity. During the distribution of some gift-packs, also Esposito, these recognize and denounce the spot.

So begins a comical car chase with a fat police officer, Sergeant Lorenzo Buttoni (Aldo Fabrizi).
At first unable to capture him, but then cheated by Esposito, if he blurts out. Suspended from duty for the protests of Mr. Locuzzo, the agent Bottoni risk of losing their jobs if they fail to stop the thief within three months. Dressed civilian clothes and hid the incident to his family, goes in search of Esposito. Find his house and so he knows the family, trying to ingraziarsela with favors and offers of food. Esposito, however, no trace. Gradually the two families become friends, and between his brother's wife's "Thief" and the daughter of the "guard" is a sympathy.

Comes the day of the meal during which you know the two families and is taken for granted the presence of Esposito, unaware of his identity. Currently dell'agnizione, which takes place outside the home, Esposito chides him for having taken away the good faith of his family, while Bottoni confides his drama. A sort of human complicity develops between the two. So the roles are reversed and it is the same Esposito who decided to carry him to prison, despite the sergeant he is now reluctant. By hiding the truth to their families, believing instead that they have common concerns, the two leave the room friendly by making them believe that Esposito leaves for a business trip and accompany him to the station buttons. In his absence, will be Bottoni to think about the Esposito family.

Cast
Totò: Ferdinando Esposito
Aldo Fabrizi: Lorenzo Bottoni
Pina Piovani: Donata
Carlo Delle Piane: Libero Esposito
Ernesto Almirante: Carlo Esposito
Gino Leurini: Alfredo
Ave Ninchi: Giovanna
Rossana Podestà: Liliana Bottoni
Paolo Modugno: Paolo Bottoni
Aldo Giuffrè: Amilcare
Mario Castellani: taxi driver
William Tubbs: Mr. Locuzzo
Pietro Carloni: commissary
Gino Scotti: deputy commissary
Armando Guarnieri: barber
Luciano Bonanni: second barber
Giulio Calì
Ciro Berardi
Carlo Mazzarella
Aldo Alimonti
Riccardo Antolini
Alida Cappellini
Rocco D'Assunta
Ettore Jannetti

Production
The subject of Cops and Robbers was born Piero Tellini, which was inspired by an idea had by Federico Fellini. The film was to be directed by Luigi Zampa. The director wanted to allocate the proportion of the guard at Peppino De Filippo and that of his wife Anna Magnani, but had to cancel the movie because some of his old movies had problems with censorship. So the direction was entrusted to Monicelli and Steno. The film was one of the first to be produced by the production house "Ponti-De Laurentiis" and was Carlo Ponti had the idea to put together Totò and Aldo Fabrizi. In real life, the two actors were affectionate friends, but had never worked together. Everyone was worried about what might happen Totò and putting together Fabrizi, however, everything went very well. Totò was a bit 'hesitant at first, when he was offered the role, because it was very different from the characters he had played before. The shooting of Steno and Monicelli began February 3, 1951, but because of the problems they had with the censorship the film was released towards the end of the year, so Steno and Monicelli had to change some things in the film already shot.

In more than a chase scene you can see that the 4 actors (Totò, Fabrizi, Castellani and Tubbs), obviously framed from behind, have been replaced by doubles and an example is the scene of the crossing in the mud.
Aldo Fabrizi and Totò were not able to finish the scene where they are sitting at the inn. The cause was the laughter that the two actors could not hold back during the course of the sequence. In more than one occasion Fabrizi watered the face of Totò with coffee that had just taken, because suddenly burst out laughing.

Distribution
Italy: Guardie e ladri, November 29, 1951
France: Gendarmes et Thieves, October 10, 1952 – October 23, 1981 (re-release)
Portugal: Polícia and Ladrão, November 21, 1952
Denmark: Betjenten og Tyven, May 11, 1953
UK: Cops and Robbers, January 29, 1953
Finland: Ikuisen kaupungin varas, September 24, 1954
West Germany: Räuber und Gendarm, 1957
Belgium: Gendarmes et Thieves
Spain: Guardias y ladrones
Argentina: Policias y ladrones
Hungary: Rendőrök és tolvajok
Poland: Zlodzieje the policjanci
Egypt
Uruguay
Turkey
Russia
China: 警察與小偷

Box office 
The proceeds of the film was ₤ 653.790.000, became one of the highest-grossing films of Totò.

Awards
1952 Cannes Film Festival: Best Screenplay
Nastro d'Argento: Best Actor (Totò)

Citations
The sequence in which Fabrizi, at the end of the chase, Totò recommends a cure for the liver, was later explicitly mentioned in the movie L'armata Brancaleone (1966), by Mario Monicelli.
The scene in which Totò fishing from a grocery store was already used in his first film Fermo con le mani (1937), where fishing from the fishmonger's counter.
The scene of the inn is reminiscent of Totò and Carolina (1955), by Mario Monicelli.

Remake

In 1997 Russian cinema has made a remake of the film.

References

External links 

  

1951 films
1950s Italian-language films
Italian black-and-white films
1950s crime comedy-drama films
Italian crime comedy-drama films
Films set in Rome
Films directed by Mario Monicelli
Films directed by Stefano Vanzina
Social realism in film
Commedia all'italiana
Films with screenplays by Ruggero Maccari
1951 comedy films
1951 drama films
Films scored by Alessandro Cicognini
1950s Italian films